Fox Sports Tennessee holds the regional cable television rights to the Memphis Grizzlies of the NBA and the Nashville Predators of the NHL. It also carries simulcasts of Major League Baseball games, carrying Cincinnati Reds games televised by Fox Sports Ohio, St. Louis Cardinals games televised by Fox Sports Midwest and (within Tennessee) Atlanta Braves games televised by Fox Sports South, as well as coverage of collegiate sports events from the Southeastern Conference.

Radio

On August 15, 2011, it was confirmed that WPRT would switch to a sports format. Adopting the new moniker "102.5 The Game", the format change took effect on Monday, August 29, 2011, at 6 AM, following a weekend of stunting of construction sounds, Nashville Predators highlights, and a loop for several hours of the closing chorus of "The Party's Over" by Journey. The station took over flagship status for the Predators after a one-year stint on sister-station 102.9 The Buzz. Upon its format change, the station announced it would become a primary affiliate of ESPN Radio in six weeks after launch. This delay was due to ESPN Radio exercising an eight-week exit clause (executed two weeks prior to launch) in the contract with secondary affiliate WGFX-FM.  Upon assumption of the affiliation, WPRT-FM began to carry various ESPN Radio programming including The Herd with Colin Cowherd, SVP & Russillo, and SportsCenter Nightly.

Television

Current on-air staff

 Willy Daunic – play-by-play
 Chris Mason – color commentator
 Lyndsay Rowley – Preds Live anchor, away game bench reporter
 Kara Hammer - Home game bench reporter
 Hal Gill - intermission commentator
 Kelsey Wingert – Preds Studio Update Host

References

External links
Preds Announce Broadcast Team for 2017-18 Season
Preds' TV, radio broadcast teams change
Pete Weber Celebrates Broadcasting Milestone 

Lists of National Hockey League broadcasters
Nashville Predators announcers
broadcasters
Fox Sports Networks
Bally Sports